The Museum of Traditional Theater, also known as the Taiwanese Opera and Puppet Museum in Pingtung, is a museum in Chaozhou Township, Pingtung County, Taiwan.

History
The museum building used to house the Chaozhou Town Hall during the Japanese rule of Taiwan. After the handover of Taiwan from Japan to the Republic of China in 1945, the building was used for telecommunication service purpose. Later on, the building housed a post office. In 2002, the Pingtung County Government renovated the building as a venue for the promotion of traditional arts.

Transportation
The museum is accessible within walking distance east of Chaozhou Station of Taiwan Railways.

See also
 List of museums in Taiwan

References

External links

Museums in Pingtung County